Gianfranco Giachetti (27 September 1888 – 29 November 1936) was an Italian stage and film actor. He played the role of Father Costanzo in Alessandro Blasetti's historical film 1860. The same year he appeared in The Old Guard as Doctor Cardini, the father of a young blackshirt who is killed in a street fight.

Selected filmography 
 Figaro and His Great Day (1931)
 The Opera Singer (1932)
 The Last Adventure (1932)
 Paprika (1933)
 Model Wanted (1933)
 The Lucky Diamond (1933)
 1860 (1934)
 The Old Guard (1934)
 Aldebaran (1935)

References

Bibliography 
 Landy, Marcia. Italian Film. Cambridge University Press, 2000 .

External links 
 

1888 births
1936 deaths
Italian male film actors
Italian male stage actors
Actors from Florence
20th-century Italian male actors